Pelegrina galathea, commonly known as the peppered jumper, is a species of jumping spider (family Salticidae). It is endemic to North America, occurring from Canada to Costa Rica. It is normally found in sunlit, grassy areas.

References

External links

Peppered Jumper at Bugguide.net

Salticidae
Spiders of North America
Spiders described in 1837